Lota railway station is located on the Cleveland line in Queensland, Australia. It serves the Brisbane suburb of Lota.

History
In 1889, the Cleveland line was extended from Manly to the original Cleveland station.

On 1 November 1960, Lota became the terminus of the line when it was curtailed. The line from Lota to Cleveland was rebuilt, and reopened on a new alignment to Thorneside on 25 September 1982 and Cleveland on 24 October 1987.

In 1995, the timber building was replaced by a brick structure and a crossing loop added. In 2006 the wooden rail bridge leading to the station from the north was replaced with a concrete bridge.

Services
Lota is served by Cleveland line services from Shorncliffe, Northgate, Doomben and Bowen Hills to Cleveland.

Services by platform

References

External links

Lota station Queensland's Railways on the Internet
[ Lota station] TransLink travel information

Lota, Queensland
Railway stations in Brisbane
Railway stations in Australia opened in 1889